Bending the Arc is a 2017 documentary film. It tells the story of Partners in Health and doctors and humanitarians, Jim Yong Kim, Ophelia Dahl, and Paul Farmer, who are devoted to innovative health care in impoverished nations. Directors Kief Davidson and Pedro Kos follow their ongoing struggle to treat and eradicate tuberculosis and HIV/AIDS in rural areas of Haiti, Peru, and Rwanda.

Synopsis
Paul Farmer and Jim Yong Kim met at Harvard Medical School in the 1980s and were both drawn to medicine by a shared desire for social justice. Along with activist Ophelia Dahl, they decided to try and make quality healthcare available to those in poor countries. They raised funding and opened a clinic in rural Haiti, but realized they needed to incorporate more community work to realize their goals. Through dramatically increased cultural sensitivity, pointed listening skills, local partnerships, and home visits, treatment drastically improved, leading to Partners In Health. The film follows their story from their beginnings in Haiti, to treating multi-drug-resistant tuberculosis in Peru, and advocating for and implementing antiretroviral HIV therapy in Rwanda alongside Dr. Agnes Binagwaho.

Production
The directors of Bending the Arc, Kief Davidson and Pedro Kos, primarily use a traditional documentary format, mixing earlier video footage and current interviews to tell the story of how Jim Kim, Ophelia Dahl, and Paul Farmer developed Partners in Health.  Where they deviate a bit is in showing older footage to their protagonists, in order to elicit their present-day reactions.

Release
The film has been screened at Sundance Film Festival, Miami International Film Festival, and the San Francisco Film Festival.

At the Greenwich International Film Festival in 2017, it won Best Documentary Feature Film.

References

External links
 Official website
 

American documentary films
Partners in Health
2017 films
2010s English-language films
2010s American films